Charles Dennis Holmes (born October 3, 1950) is an American film and television actor. He is known for playing Mike Williams in the American western television series Laramie.

Life and career 
Holmes was born in Encino, California. Between 1958 and 1961 he appeared in the films Hound-Dog Man, Violent Road, The Fiercest Heart, Key Witness and Woman Obsessed. He joined the cast of the western television series Laramie in 1961, first appearing in the episode "Dragon at the Door" in the series’s third season.

Holmes retired from acting in 1964, with his last credit being in the western television series Wagon Train. After retiring, Holmes worked as a technology specialist in California.

References

External links 

Rotten Tomatoes profile

1950 births
Living people
People from Encino, Los Angeles
Male actors from Los Angeles
Male actors from California
American male film actors
American male television actors
American male child actors
20th-century American male actors
Western (genre) television actors